Shree Venkateshwara Devasthanam is a Hindu temple that is an abode of Lord Vishnu has been established in Najafgarh, southwest of New Delhi. Dolly Mai laid the cornerstone for this Hindu temple on February 5, 2022. On August 21, 2022, she officially opened this temple alongside her friends Laxmi Narayan Tripathi, Meera Guru, Radha Maa, Bhawani Maa, and others. The wake-up prayer to Sri Venkateswara is offered by the priests before the presiding deity awakens inside the sanctum sanctorum, as is customary in south Indian temples. This is basically replica of world famous Tirupati Balaji Temple in which customers have strong faith and because of this south customs are being followed in this temple too. In addition to serving religious needs, the temple also has a social function. All individuals in need or distress are supported and helped by the trust of Shree Venkateshwara Devasthanam.

Temple Architecture

This Hindu temple is situated on a 30-by-60-foot plot of ground in Delhi. There is a 30- to 60-foot-long foyer that connects the temple's interior to its entrance. The lowest level of the building is kept completely open due to the property's small size, and the temple is constructed on the first floor using robust raw material.

The temple has Dravidian architectural features and is constructed in the Tirupati Balaji Mandir style. South Indian deities, particularly Lord Venkateshwara, and Dravidian architecture are both fascinating to Dolly Mai. Her devotion to Lord Vishnu pushed her to construct the replica of Tirupati Balaji in Delhi. Mr. Suresh, a Vastu Shastra expert, has provided guidance regarding the temple's Vastu.

The temple is two feet above the ground. The temple features a private apartment on one side and a 12-by-12-foot open gaushala (cow's abode) on the other side. The temple has stairs on both sides and an alley in the back. This Balaji temple was built using reinforced cement concrete (RCC) and bricks for durability. The floor of the temple has been predominantly decorated with granite stone.

Statues of Goddess Padmawati, Goddess Bhoodevi, Lord Garud, and Lord Hanuman have all been placed in this temple in addition to Lord Balaji Maharaj. The majestic sanctorum, which houses the residences of all the gods, is constructed in a square with various sizes. Lord Balaji's statue is eight feet and eight inches tall. The 4.25-foot-tall, east-facing dome that sits atop the lord's idol is 9 feet tall. The five-foot tall mansions of the goddesses Padmavati and Bhoodevi are located on Lord Vishnu's left and right sides, respectively. The idols of both goddesses stand 3.25 feet tall and are surrounded by a 6 foot high dome.

Special places have also been created in front of the gods and goddesses to install statues of Lord Garud and Lord Hanuman, measuring 3/3 feet and 2'1/2 feet, respectively. Standing Lord Hanuman and Lord Garuda are placed who are faced towards Lord Venkateswara. There is also a dome, which towers four feet over these statues. The entrance's 12-foot-long, superbly crafted steel gate features a South Indian motif.

The doors to the mandir's sanctum entrances are all constructed of teak wood and have intricate metal carvings. God Venkateshwara's sanctuary's inner door is 4.7 feet long. The idols were purchased from Namakkal by Radha Maa (Dolly Mai's close friend and advisor). Further, all of the idols are crafted from Krishnashila, a hard stone that can only be found in South India. There is a granite platform that is one foot in diameter inside the Sanctorum. The idols are positioned in this manner, 3.25 feet above the ground. The gods and goddesses have the same decoration as the gods and goddesses in the temples of southern India.

Every day, garlands composed of various flower species are used to decorate the deity. Lord Balaji Maharaj is dressed in a dhoti and silk gamchha. Apart from this, Goddess Padmavati, Goddess Bhudevi, and Lord Garud, are dressed in dhotis and silk sarees, they look so beautiful and lively. The courtyard's beautiful chandelier and the other lights create a positive atmosphere.

About Founder

Dolly Mai laid the foundation stone of this temple. She was always regarded as eunuch, a worthless individual. She faced various challenges in the family. Her mentor and mother figure, Geeta Haji, started teaching her. Geeta's direction helped Dolly grow in vision and self-awareness. Her search for an answer for why eunuchs are treated in an inappropriate manner" was spurred by the abuse and insults aimed at her and other community members. The problem was how to deal with society's prejudices.

She described to her coworkers her vision of a magnificent Lord Vishnu temple shaped like Venkatesh. The god who came to earth during the mythological Kalyug era to rescue people from the suffering of the materialistic world. She was successful in convincing her community to support the construction of the Balaji Devasthanam. Radha Maa, Meera Guru, Ramya, Pooja Maa, Kala, Kajri, Sita, Seema, Julie, Gudiya, Laxmi Narayan Tripathi, Pinki Maa, and her community helped her in her endeavors.

Replica of Sri Venkateswara Swami Vaari Temple

This temple is a replica of the famous Sri Venkateswara Swami Vaari Temple located in the hill town of Tirumala in the Tirupati district of the Indian state, Andhra Pradesh. The temple is dedicated to Venkateswara, a Vishnu avatar who is believed to have arrived on earth to save humanity from the hardships of the Kali Yuga. Tirumala Tirupati Devasthanams (TTD), which is in charge of the temple, is under the supervision of the Andhra Pradesh government. The TTD's leader is chosen by the state government itself. The revenue from this shrine is used by the state of Andhra Pradesh.

The temple is built in the manner of South Indian architecture and is said to have been constructed over several years, commencing around 300 CE. In the temple, the Vaikhanasa Agama tradition of worship is practised. One of the eight Vishnu Swayambhu Kshetras, the temple is regarded as the 75th Divya Desam.

Trust of Temple

Dolly Mai established a religious and charitable trust called the "Shree Venkateshwara Devasthanam, Najafgarh Trust" with the execution of the trust agreement on March 31, 2022. This charitable trust was established to benefit animals and underprivileged people directly or through other organizations, and to create Balaji Devasthanam, a public place of worship and meditation. The trust engages in religious work and sponsors initiatives like patrika prakashan, Gau Sewa, Sankirtan, and the promotion of Sanatan Dharm.

Temples, Mosques, Churches, Gurudwaras, and other religious organizations get support and donations from the Shree Venkateshwara Devasthanam, Najafgarh Trust. The goal of Shree Venkateshwara Devasthanam in Najafgarh is to offer facilities for feeding both cattle and the underprivileged. The trust establishes and maintains residences for senior residents and physically challenged people as well as livestock shelters. This trust gives money to poor households during their daughters' weddings.

Dolly Mai, Parveen Kumar, Jatin Ahlawat, and Pradeep Kumar have all agreed to serve as trustees. The trust's office is located at Tract No. 122 A, Ground Floor, Kh.no. 5/6/1, Gali No. 7, Deepak Vihar, South-West Delhi, Delhi-110043. The trustees have choose one representative from among themselves to fill the positions of vice president, secretary, and treasurer for the trust. Vice President, Secretary, and Treasurer terms are for one year starting on the date of their appointment, and they are eligible for reelection. No trustee, not even the Managing Trustee, may hold multiple offices concurrently. Nonetheless, in the Managing trustee's absence, the Vice-President will take over such responsibilities.

The managing trustee will serve as the person's administrative mentor and overseer, and the vice president, secretary, and treasurer will directly answer to him.

Temple Aarti Schedule

As is the tradition in South Indian Temples, the wake-up prayer to Sri Venkateswara is offered by the priests as per the ritulas using diya, dhoop, flowers, etc.

References

External links